Kilkenny West is a civil parish in County Westmeath, Ireland.

Kilkenny West is one of 4 civil parishes in the barony of Kilkenny West in the Province of Leinster.

Kilkenny West civil parish comprises the village of Glassan and 45 townlands: 
Annagh, Auburn, Ballaghkeeran Big, Ballaghkeeran Little, Ballyboy Lowpark, Ballynacliffy, Ballynakill, Ballynakill Upper, Bethlehem, Bleanphuttoge, Boardsland, Brittas, Caplahard, Carrickfin, Cartronkeel, Corr, Creevenmanagh, Deerpark, Farrannamoreen, Fortyacres, Glassan, Kilfaughny, Kilkenny Abbey, Kilkenny Lanesborough, Kilkenny West, Lackan, Lisdachon, Lisnascreen, Lissatunny, Lissoy, Littletown, Lowpark Ballyboy, Lurgan, Magheracuirknagh, Pearsonsbrook, Portaneena, Rath, Temple's Island, Toberclare, Tobernagauhoge, Tonagh, Tullaghan, Tullyhogan, Tullyhumphrys, Tullylanesborough and Waterstown

The neighbouring civil parishes are: Shrule (County Longford) to the north, Noughaval to the north–east,
Drumraney  to the east, Ballyloughloe and St. Mary's to the south, Bunown to the west and Noughaval to the north–west.

References

External links
Kilkenny West civil parish at the IreAtlas Townland Data Base
Kilkenny West civil parish at townlands.ie
Kilkenny West civil parish at The Placenames Database of Ireland

Civil parishes of County Westmeath